West Shore State Park is a public recreation area occupying 129 acres on the western shore of Flathead Lake five miles south of Lakeside in Lake County, Montana. The state park offers boating, fishing, camping, swimming, hiking, and wildlife viewing.

References

External links
West Shore State Park Montana Fish, Wildlife & Parks
West Shore State Park Trail Map Montana Fish, Wildlife & Parks

State parks of Montana
Protected areas of Lake County, Montana
Protected areas established in 1955
1955 establishments in Montana